The 2009–10 Ole Miss Rebels men's basketball team represented the University of Mississippi in the 2009–10 college basketball season. This was head coach Andy Kennedy's fourth season at Ole Miss. The Rebels compete in the Southeastern Conference and played their home games at Tad Smith Coliseum. They finished 24–11, 9–7 in SEC play and lost in the quarterfinals of the 2010 SEC men's basketball tournament. They were invited to the 2010 National Invitation Tournament where they advanced to the semifinals before falling to Dayton.

Roster
Source

Rankings

Schedule and results
Source
All times are Central

|-
!colspan=9| Exhibition

|-
!colspan=9| Regular Season

|-
!colspan=10| 2010 SEC men's basketball tournament

|-
!colspan=10| 2010 National Invitation Tournament

References

Ole Miss
Ole Miss
Ole Miss Rebels men's basketball seasons
Ole Miss Rebels
Ole Miss Rebels